Don't Tell Father is a British comedy television series which first aired on BBC One in 1992.

A self-regarding veteran actor dominates the lives of his fifth wife and four grown-up children. He is particularly outraged by his eldest daughter's engagement to a driving instructor.

Cast
 Tony Britton as Vivian Bancroft (6 episodes)
 Susan Hampshire as Natasha Bancroft (6 episodes)
 Caroline Quentin as Kate Bancroft (6 episodes)
 Philip Fox as Marvin Whipple (6 episodes)
 Richard Ashton as Garth Bancroft (6 episodes)
 Hilda Braid as  Mrs. Dawson (3 episodes)
 Liz Daniels as Alemka (3 episodes)
 Anna Dawson as  Stella Whipple (3 episodes)
 Jack Smethurst as Ron Whipple (3 episodes)
 Jo-Anne Sale as Spirit (2 episodes)

References

Bibliography
 David Leafe. British Film Institute Film and Television Handbook 1993. Bloomsbury Academic, 1992.

External links
 

BBC television sitcoms
1992 British television series debuts
1992 British television series endings
1990s British comedy television series
English-language television shows